As of March 8, 2023,  This list of Guantánamo prisoners has the known identities of prisoners at the Guantanamo Bay detention camp in Cuba, but is compiled from various sources and is incomplete. In official documents, the United States Department of Defense (DoD) continues to make intermittent efforts to redact prisoner's names.  they had not published an official list of detainees. On April 19, 2006, the DoD released a list with 558 names  in what appears to be a fax or other scanned image. The Associated Press published the list in more accessible text form.

The Washington Post maintains a list of the prisoners known or suspected to have been held in Guantánamo Bay. On March 3, 2006 the DoD partially complied with a court order to release the names of the remaining Guantánamo detainees. The court order required the DoD to release the names of all the detainees. Initially, the DoD released only 317 names. On April 19, 2006, the DoD released a list with 558 names. Although Judge Jed Rakoff had already dismissed this argument, Pentagon spokesmen Bryan Whitman justified withholding the names out of a concern for the detainees' privacy. On April 20, 2006, the DoD released a portable document format file that listed 558 names. The 558 individuals on the list were those whose detention had been reviewed by a Combatant Status Review Tribunal (CSRT). The list gave the detainee's ID number, their name, and their home country.

The names of several hundred prisoners who had been released prior to the commencement of the CSRTs were not released.  The list did not specify whether the prisoners were still in detention at Guantanamo; whether they had been determined to be "enemy combatants"; whether they were released, or repatriated to the custody of their home countries. On May 15, 2006, the DOD released what they called a complete list of all 759 former and current inmates who had been held in military custody in the detainment camps after a Freedom of Information Act (FOIA) action was filed by the Associated Press. On June 17, 2013, the Miami Herald published a list, obtained using the Freedom of Information Act, of 48 prisoners who were designated for indefinite detainment. On May 31, 2014, the Obama Administration was reported to have swapped 5 prisoners (Abdul Haq Wasiq, Mullah Norullah Nori, Khairullah Khairkhwa, Mohammed Nabi and Mohammed Fazi) in return for Sergeant Bowe Bergdahl who was captured after deserting his post.

On January 16, 2017, the Federal government of the United States announced that ten more prisoners were released to Oman, leaving about 45 detainees. Of all prisoners at Guantanamo, Afghans were the largest group (29 percent), followed by Saudi Arabians (17 percent), Yemenis (15 percent), Pakistanis (9 percent), and Algerians (3 percent). Overall, 50 nationalities were present at Guantanamo.

List

780 detainees have been brought to Guantanamo. Although most of these have been released without charge, the United States government continues to classify many of these released detainees as "enemy combatants". As of January 5, 2017, 55 detainees remained at Guantanamo. By January 19, 2017, at the end of the Obama Administration, the detention center remained open with 41 detainees remaining.

CSRT is Combatant Status Review Tribunals.

Individuals with "SAMWL" are listed on the Saudi Arabian most wanted list, released in February 2009.

Details about seven deaths reported as suicides and reports of attempted suicides is at Guantanamo suicide attempts.

Surnames beginning with A

Surnames beginning with Aa to Ak

Surnames beginning with Al

Surnames beginning with Am to Az

Surnames beginning with B

Surnames beginning with C

Surnames beginning with D

Surnames beginning with E

Surnames beginning with F

Surnames beginning with G

Surnames beginning with H

Surnames beginning with I

Surnames beginning with J

Surnames beginning with K

Surnames beginning with L

Surnames beginning with M

Surnames beginning with N

Surnames beginning with O

Surnames beginning with P

Surnames beginning with Q

Surnames beginning with R

Surnames beginning with S

Surnames beginning with T

Surnames beginning with U

Surnames beginning with V

Surnames beginning with W

Surnames beginning with Y

Surnames beginning with Z

See also
List of current detainees at Guantanamo Bay
Guantanamo Bay captives habeas corpus
A Profile of 517 Detainees through Analysis of Department of Defense Data
Faisalabad Three

Guantanamo detainees by nationality

Afghan detainees at Guantanamo Bay
American detainees at Guantanamo Bay
Bahraini captives in Guantanamo
Bosnian captives in Guantanamo
British captives in Guantanamo
Danish captives in Guantanamo
Egyptian captives in Guantanamo
French captives in Guantanamo
Iraqi detainees at Guantanamo Bay
Kazakhstani captives in Guantanamo
Kuwaiti captives in Guantanamo
Libyan captives in Guantanamo
Moroccan captives in Guantanamo
Pakistani captives in Guantanamo
Russian captives in Guantanamo
Saudi captives in Guantanamo
Spanish captives in Guantanamo
Sudanese captives in Guantanamo
Swedish captives in Guantanamo
Syrian captives in Guantanamo
Tajik captives in Guantanamo
Uyghur detainees at Guantanamo Bay
Uzbek captives in Guantanamo
Yemeni detainees at Guantanamo Bay

References

External links
Guantánamo: The Definitive Prisoner List (Part 1) - Andy Worthington 
Names of the Detained in Guantánamo Bay, Cuba (sorted by nationality)
Associated Press Guantánamo Detainee Court Documents Archive
Office of the Secretary of Defense & Joint Staff—FOIA Requester Service Center 
Executive Order Task Force—Guantanamo Final Review Dispositions as of January 22, 2010 
Pentagon charges 6 in 9-11 attacks
'Clean team' interrogated 9-11 suspects
New York Times Guantanamo research database